The 1945 Railway Cup Hurling Championship was the 19th series of the inter-provincial hurling Railway Cup. Four matches were played between 11 February and 17 March 1945. It was contested by Connacht, Leinster, Munster and Ulster.

Munster entered the championship as the defending champions.

On 17 March 1945, Munster won the Railway Cup after a 6-08 to 2-00 defeat of Ulster in the final at Croke Park, Dublin. This was their 13th title over all and their fourth title in succession.

Munster's Mick Mackey was the Railway Cup top scorer with 3-06.

Results

Semi-finals

Final

Top scorers

Overall

Single game

Sources
 Donegan, Des, The Complete Handbook of Gaelic Games (DBA Publications Limited, 2005).
 Fennelly, Teddy and Dowling, Paddy, "Ninety Years of GAA in Laois" (Leinster Express, 1975)

External links
 Munster Railway Cup-winning teams

Railway Cup Hurling Championship
Railway Cup Hurling Championship